WAOB (860 kHz) is an AM radio station licensed to Millvale, Pennsylvania and serving Greater Pittsburgh.  It is owned by St. Joseph Ministries and carries a Catholic talk and teaching radio format.  Some shows are locally produced in cooperation with the Diocese of Pittsburgh and some are from EWTN Radio.  The studios and offices are on Ligonier Street in Latrobe, Pennsylvania.  For 50 years, the station had served Pittsburgh's African-American community as WAMO (now on AM 660).

By day, WAOB transmits with 1,000 watts, but because 860 AM is a clear channel frequency reserved for CJBC Toronto, WAOB must reduce power at night to 830 watts to avoid interference.  It uses a directional antenna at all times.  Programming is simulcast on 106.7 WAOB-FM in Beaver Falls, Pennsylvania, and WPGR 1510 AM in Monroeville, Pennsylvania.

History 

In 1948, the station signed on as WHOD, licensed to Homestead, Pennsylvania.  It was originally owned by Steel City Broadcasting, Inc.  (Pittsburgh is known as the "Steel City.)  It was powered at only 250 watts and was a daytimer, required to go off the air at night.

It changed its call sign to WAMO in 1956 (the AMO referred to the Allegheny, Monongahela and Ohio rivers), and switched its city of license to Pittsburgh.  WAMO served the area's African-American community for the following 50 years, playing R&B and soul music, with some Black talk and news programming during the week and religious programming on Sundays.  In 1960, it added an FM simulcast on 105.9 WAMO-FM (now WXDX-FM).  Over time, WAMO-FM became an urban contemporary station while WAMO 860 specialized in Black news, talk, classic soul music and urban gospel.

In the 1990s its signal was upgraded, and its city of license was changed from Pittsburgh to Millvale.  For a time during the 1990s, the station bounced back between the call letters WYJZ and WAMO.

What put WAMO on the map, though, was in the 1950s, when WAMO disc jockey Craig "Porky" Chedwick started playing a variety of what then came to be known as "the first oldies."  He scoured record bins and antique stores for lost R&B recordings, building up a library of records and creating through his show what came to be later known as "Pittsburgh's Oldies", using a style later imitated by other DJs in Pittsburgh and across the country.  Many credit Chedwick with being the father of "Oldies" radio.

On January 31, 2006, WAMO signed a deal with Radio One to pick up its Urban Talk line up of hosts. The change took place on February 27, 2006.  This format did not last long, and on August 28, 2006, the station returned to playing music it described as "R&B and classic soul," retaining the syndicated Steve Harvey and Bev Smith programs in mornings and late-nights, respectively.

On May 15, 2009, Sheridan announced the sale of WAMO-AM, WAMO-FM and WPGR-AM to St. Joseph Missions. On September 8, 2009, WAMO-AM and its FM sister station signed off the air, ending a 61-year legacy of serving Pittsburgh's African-American community. The call letters were changed to WAOB and the station returned to the air in February 2010, as a non-commercial religious outlet.

Another AM station in the Pittsburgh radio market, on 660 AM in Wilkinsburg, Pennsylvania, picked up the WAMO call letters and now carries urban contemporary programming on its AM frequency as well as an FM translator at 107.3 MHz.

References

External links 

African-American history in Pittsburgh
AOB (AM)
Radio stations established in 1948
1948 establishments in Pennsylvania
AOB (AM)